Ryan David Sierakowski (born 7 August 1997) is an American professional soccer player who plays as a forward.

Career

Youth & College
Sierakowski attended Michigan State University, where he played college soccer for four years between 2015 and 2018, making 81 appearances, scoring 33 goals and tallying 16 assists. Sierakowski holds the record for most career points by a Michigan State University soccer player in the history of the program. Sierakowski is the first, and only, player to lead the team in points (goals and assists combined) in all four seasons of his collegiate career.

While in college, Sierakowski played in the PDL with Chicago FC United.

Professional career
On January 11, 2019, Sierakowski was drafted 23rd overall in the 2019 MLS SuperDraft, by Portland Timbers. He signed with USL Championship side Portland Timbers 2 on March 1, 2019.

On July 9, 2020, Sierakowski was signed by Real Monarchs of the USL Championship. His option was declined by Real Monarchs following the 2020 season.

In March 2021, Sierakowski joined USL League One side New England Revolution II ahead of the 2021 season. He scored on his debut for the club, claiming the winner in 1–0 victory over Fort Lauderdale CF on April 10, 2021.

On August 20, 2021, Sierakowski was loaned to Forward Madison FC, also of USL League One.

Sierakowski was not announced as a returning player for the club's 2022 season where they would be competing in the newly formed MLS Next Pro.

On May 1, 2022, Sierakowski signed with Greek second-tier side Episkopi. However, he returned to the United States soon after, joining USL League One club South Georgia Tormenta on July 28, 2022.

References 

1997 births
Living people
American soccer players
Association football forwards
Chicago FC United players
Michigan State Spartans men's soccer players
New England Revolution II players
People from McHenry, Illinois
Portland Timbers draft picks
Portland Timbers 2 players
Real Monarchs players
Forward Madison FC players
Episkopi F.C. players
Tormenta FC players
Soccer players from Illinois
Sportspeople from the Chicago metropolitan area
USL Championship players
USL League One players
USL League Two players